Mokapu Point is part of the Marine Corps Base Hawaii. The area hosts a nesting colony of Red-Footed Boobies Geologically it is a segment of a former caldera that was part of the prehistoric Ko'olau Volcano. Access is limited only for authorized biological studies or military purposes.

In Hawaiian lore, it is the birthplace of mankind  and is considered sacred ground.

References 

Geography of Hawaii